Kettering is a town in Northamptonshire, England.

Kettering may also refer to:

Places
Kettering, Tasmania, a coastal town in Australia
Kettering, Jamaica, a former Free Village
Kettering, Maryland, an incorporated area in Maryland, United States
Kettering, Ohio, a suburb of Dayton, Ohio, United States
Borough of Kettering, a former district of Northamptonshire, England that contained the town
Kettering (UK Parliament constituency)

Other uses
Kettering College in Kettering, Ohio
Kettering University in Flint, Michigan
Kettering Tower, a high-rise building in Dayton, Ohio
Kettering Town F.C.
Kettering Rugby Football Club
"Kettering", a 2009 song by the Antlers from Hospice

People with the surname
Charles F. Kettering, American inventor
Steve Kettering, American politician

See also
Kettering Medical Center, Kettering, Ohio
Memorial Sloan-Kettering Cancer Center, New York City
Catering